Uncle Vanya is a 1957 American film adaptation of the 1899 play Uncle Vanya by Anton Chekhov. Filmed concurrently with an Off Broadway production, it was both co-produced and co-directed by actor Franchot Tone, who starred as Dr. Astroff. Tone's wife at the time, Dolores Dorn-Heft, co-starred as Elena Andreevna, appearing in the only role not featuring an actor from the stage version in New York, where the part was played by Signe Hasso. The title role was played by George Voskovec.

Edited from Stark Young's translation of Chekhov's Russian text, the film runs 98 minutes. It was released on DVD in June, 2010.

Production
Tone performed the play off Broadway in 1956. He decided to make a film of it, using more sets. It was shot over 24 days.

See also
 List of American films of 1957

References

External links

Appreciation of film at Blog Critics
Review of film at New York Times

1957 films
Films based on Uncle Vanya
1957 drama films
American drama films
Films scored by Werner Janssen
1950s English-language films
1950s American films